Fruta de Leite is a municipality in the northeast of the Brazilian state of Minas Gerais.  the population was 5,299 in a total area of . It became a municipality in 1997. The postal code (CEP) is 39558-000.

Fruta de Leite is part of the statistical microregion of Salinas. It lies just north of the important federal highway BR-251, which links Montes Claros to the Rio-Bahia (BR-116).

Due to isolation and poor soils this is one of the poorest municipalities in the state and in the country. The main economic activities are cattle raising (31,000 head in 2006) and farming with modest production of coffee, oranges, mangoes, corn, sugarcane, and bananas. Cropland made up . There were only two tractors. In the urban area there were no financial institutions . There were 85 automobiles, giving a ratio of about one automobile for every 75 inhabitants. Health care was provided by three public health clinics. Educational needs were met by nine primary schools and one middle school. There were no hospitals.

Municipal Human Development Index
MHDI: .586 (2000)
State ranking: 845 out of 853 municipalities
National ranking: 4,897 out of 5,138 municipalities
Life expectancy: 67
Literacy rate: 55
Combined primary, secondary and tertiary gross enrolment ratio: .736
Per capita income (monthly): R$55.76

See also
List of municipalities in Minas Gerais

References

IBGE

Municipalities in Minas Gerais